Francisco Lerma Martínez (4 May 1944 – 24 April 2019) was a Mozambican Roman Catholic bishop.

Lerma Martínez was born in Spain and was ordained to the priesthood in 1969. He served as bishop of the Roman Catholic Diocese of Gurué, Mozambique from 2010 until his death in 2019.

Notes

1944 births
2019 deaths
21st-century Roman Catholic bishops in Mozambique
Spanish Roman Catholic bishops
Roman Catholic bishops of Gurúè
Mozambican Roman Catholic bishops